Rosemary R. Gunning (February 7, 1905 – October 4, 1997) was an American lawyer and politician from New York.

Life
Gunning was born on February 7, 1905, in Brooklyn, New York City. She attended St. Brigid's School and Richmond High School. She graduated LL.B. from Brooklyn Law School in 1927, was admitted to the bar in 1930, and practiced law in New York City. She married Lester Moffett, and they lived in Ridgewood, Queens. They had no children.

She became one of the leaders of the fight against forced desegregation busing, and in 1962 was a founding member of the Conservative Party of New York. In November 1965, she ran on the Conservative ticket for President of the City Council, but was defeated by Democrat Frank D. O'Connor. She was a delegate to the New York State Constitutional Convention of 1967. In November 1968, she was elected with Republican endorsement to the New York State Assembly, one of the first two Conservatives to win an elective state office. She was re-elected three times, and remained in the Assembly until 1976, sitting in the 178th, 179th, 180th and 181st New York State Legislatures.

She died on October 4, 1997, at the home of one of her nieces in Roslyn, New York, of liver cancer at age 92.

References

1905 births
1997 deaths
People from Queens, New York
Conservative Party of New York State politicians
Members of the New York State Assembly
Deaths from cancer in New York (state)
Women state legislators in New York (state)
Brooklyn Law School alumni
20th-century American politicians
20th-century American women politicians